The John Bettis House is a historic house on the north side of Arkansas Highway 14 in Pleasant Grove, Arkansas, a short way south of its junction with Stone County Road 32.

Description and history 
It is a -story wood-framed structure with American Craftsman styling. It is L-shaped in plan, with a broad clipped gable roof that has exposed rafter ends in the eaves. The porch, set in the crook of the L, is recessed under the roof, and is supported by battered columns on brick piers. A clipped-gable dormer projects from the roof above the porch. The house was built about 1929, and is the first farmhouse in the county documented to depart from vernacular architectural styles in which they were previously built.

The house was listed on the National Register of Historic Places on September 17, 1985.

See also
National Register of Historic Places listings in Stone County, Arkansas

References

Houses on the National Register of Historic Places in Arkansas
Houses completed in 1929
Houses in Stone County, Arkansas
National Register of Historic Places in Stone County, Arkansas
American Craftsman architecture in Arkansas